Yasna Poliana is an urban-type settlement in Kramatorsk Raion in Donetsk Oblast of eastern Ukraine. Population:

Demographics
Native language as of the Ukrainian Census of 2001:
 Ukrainian 69.79%
 Russian 28.62%
 Armenian 0.62%
 Jewish 0.27%
 Moldovan (Romanian) and Romani 0.18%

References

Urban-type settlements in Kramatorsk Raion